Michael Bartels (born 8 March 1968) is a German professional racing driver.

Career
Bartels was the 1985 German karting champion and the 1986 German Formula Ford 1600 champion. He competed in the German Formula Three Championship in 1988 and 1989, before stepping up to International Formula 3000 in 1990.

Bartels filled in at Lotus for Johnny Herbert, who had commitments in Japanese Formula 3000, at four Grands Prix during the  Formula One season, but failed to qualify at all four races. Bartels continued in F3000, finishing 4th in 1992, before switching to the DTM in 1994, where he continued to race until the series ended at the end of 1996. Bartels raced in the Super Tourenwagen Cup for the next three years, before the DTM was resurrected in 2000. He won the 24 Hours Nürburgring in 2000 (in a works Porsche 911 GT3) and 2001 (in a Chrysler Viper GTS-R).

After racing in the final year of the V8Star Series in 2003, finishing third behind Pedro Lamy and Thomas Mutsch, he switched to the FIA GT Championship for 2004 with Konrad Motorsport (in a Saleen S7R). For the 2005 season he began racing a Maserati MC12 for his own Bartels Motor & Sport team under the Vitaphone Racing banner, alongside compatriot Timo Scheider. Andrea Bertolini replaced Scheider for 2006 and the pairing won the championship in 2006, 2008 and 2009. Bartels also won the Spa 24 Hours in 2005, 2006 and 2008.

Racing record

Complete International Formula 3000 results
(key) (Races in bold indicate pole position) (Races 
in italics indicate fastest lap)

Complete Formula One results
(key) (Races in bold indicate pole position, races in italics indicate fastest lap)

Complete Deutsche Tourenwagen Meisterschaft/Masters results
(key) (Races in bold indicate pole position) (Races in italics indicate fastest lap)

† — Retired, but was classified as he completed 90% of the winner's race distance.

Complete Super Tourenwagen Cup results
(key) (Races in bold indicate pole position) (Races in italics indicate fastest lap)

Complete International Touring Car Championship results
(key) (Races in bold indicate pole position) (Races in italics indicate fastest lap)

Complete GT1 World Championship results

Complete Blancpain Sprint Series results

Personal life 
From 1992 to 1999, Bartels dated tennis player Steffi Graf.

References

External links

Official website (in German)

1968 births
Living people
People from Plettenberg
Sportspeople from Arnsberg (region)
Racing drivers from North Rhine-Westphalia
German racing drivers
German Formula One drivers
FIA GT Championship drivers
Deutsche Tourenwagen Masters drivers
Team Lotus Formula One drivers
International Formula 3000 drivers
European Le Mans Series drivers
FIA GT1 World Championship drivers
World Sportscar Championship drivers
Blancpain Endurance Series drivers
24 Hours of Spa drivers
Steffi Graf
Peugeot Sport drivers
Phoenix Racing drivers
Audi Sport drivers
Team Joest drivers
Nürburgring 24 Hours drivers